Heart Mountain can refer to:
Heart Mountain (Alberta), Canada
Heart Mountain (Alaska), United States
Heart Mountain (Colorado), United States
Heart Mountain (Idaho), United States
Heart Mountain (New Mexico), United States
Heart Mountain (Wyoming), United States
Heart Mountain War Relocation Center, Wyoming, United States